Copera ciliata, the Black-kneed Featherlegs, is a species of white-legged damselfly in the family Platycnemididae. It can be found in Vietnam

References

Further reading

 

Platycnemididae
Articles created by Qbugbot
Insects described in 1863
Odonata of Asia